Tommy Morrison vs. Donovan Ruddock, billed as "Raw Power", was a professional boxing match contested on June 10, 1995 for the IBC heavyweight title.

Background
In April 1995, a fight between former heavyweight contenders Tommy Morrison and Donovan "Razor" Ruddock was made official.

Both fighters had been top ranked heavyweights in the years prior and were looking to make a comeback after debilitating losses. Morrison was looking to bounce back into title contention after losing the WBO heavyweight title in a first-round knockout loss to Michael Bentt in October 1993. Morrison would then go undefeated in 1994 with 3 wins and 1 draw and landed a WBO heavyweight title fight against Herbie Hide on the infamous "High Noon in Hong Kong" card, but the event was cancelled at the last minute due to financial issues. With his title opportunity falling by the wayside, Morrison would go 3–0 in 1995 before landing the fight with Ruddock.

Ruddock, meanwhile, was returning after a long period of inactivity. Ruddock was a top contender before suffering a blowout loss via second-round knockout to Lennox Lewis in October 1992. After said loss, Ruddock would take over a year off before returning with a unanimous decision victory in January 1994 against Anthony Wade, but he would not fight again until the Morrison fight. Ruddock had since fallen on hard times, filing for bankruptcy and then being involved in a lawsuit with his promoter and manager Murad Muhammad over an alleged forged contract, though the lawsuit was unsuccessful and Muhammad was able to continue as Ruddock's promoter.

The fight
Despite his long layoff, Ruddock got off to a great start, dropping Morrison with an uppercut less than a minute into the first round, though Morrison got back up immediately and continued the fight. Morrison bounced back to take round two, stunning Ruddock with an uppercut of his own. Ruddock grabbed the top rope to prevent himself from going down, causing the referee to give him a standing eight count as a result. Both fighters continued to trade power punches in rounds three and four, but Ruddock took control in round five, hurting Morrison with several left hooks and keeping him at bay with his jab. Ruddock continued to control the early portion of round six, landing consecutive left hooks and causing a dazed Morrison to retreat. Ruddock pursued Morrison across the ring in effort to finish him off, but threw a wild uppercut that missed Morrison, who in turn countered with this trademark left hook, which sent Ruddock down in a heap. Ruddock got back up and was allowed to continue the fight, though Morrison quickly rushed in with a barrage of unanswered punches that caused the referee to step in and give Ruddock another standing eight count. Ruddock attempted to clinch Morrison in an effort to survive the final 30 seconds, but Morrison landed another unanswered barrage that led the referee to step in and stop the fight.

Fight card

References

1995 in boxing
Boxing matches
Boxing in Missouri
June 1995 sports events in the United States